Kouchibouguac may refer to:

 Kouchibouguac, New Brunswick, a community
 Kouchibouguac National Park, located on the east coast of New Brunswick
 Kouchibouguac River, empties into the Northumberland Strait
 Rogersville-Kouchibouguac, a provincial electoral district